Pedro de Azuaga, O.F.M. (1539 – November 1597) was a Roman Catholic prelate who served as Bishop-Elect of Santiago de Chile (1596–1597).

Biography
Pedro de Azuaga was born in Azuaga, Spain in 1539 and ordained a priest in the Order of Friars Minor.
On 29 January 1596, he was appointed during the papacy of Pope Clement VIII as Bishop of Santiago de Chile.
He died before he was consecrated bishop in November 1597.

References 

16th-century Roman Catholic bishops in Chile
Bishops appointed by Pope Clement VIII
1539 births
1597 deaths
Franciscan bishops
Roman Catholic bishops of Santiago de Chile